Lucie Vellère (23 December 1896 – 12 October 1966) was a Belgian composer.

Biography
Lucie Vellère was born in Brussels, and began piano lessons with her father at the age of six. She studied with Emile Chaumont for violin, Paul Miry for harmony, and Joseph Jongen for composition. She was awarded the 1957 "Prix du Brabant" and received an award from the American Section of the International Council for Women for her compositions. She made her primary living as a pharmacist and composed as a hobby.

Selected works
Vellère composed works for voice, solo instruments, chamber ensembles, chorus and orchestra in a traditional style. Most of her works show impressionistic tendencies.

Chanson nocturne (for violin and piano) 1920	
String Quartet No. 1 in d minor 1937	
String Quartet No. 2 in e minor 1942	
Piano Trio 1947
Fantaisie en trois mouvement (for violin and piano) 1950	
String Quartet No. 3 1951	
Nocturne (for cello and piano) 1954
Petite Symphony 1956	
Arlequinade (for trumpet and piano) 1959	
Bagatelles (String Trio) 1960	
Dialogue (for oboe and piano) 1960	
Intermède (for flute and piano) 1960
Sonata for violin and viola 1961
Divertissement (for violin and piano) 1962	
String Quartet No. 4 1962	
Quartet (for 4 clarinets) 1963	
Epitaphe pour un ami (Epitaph for a Friend) for viola and string orchestra 1964
Quartet (for flute, oboe, clarinet and bassoon)	1964	
Deux essais (for trumpet, horn and trombone) 1965

Discography
String Quartet #3. On Vive la Différence: String Quartets by 5 Women from 3 Continents, Leonarda CD #LE336 (1997)

References

External links

1896 births
1966 deaths
20th-century classical composers
Belgian music educators
Women classical composers
Belgian classical composers
Musicians from Brussels
Belgian pharmacists
Women music educators
Women pharmacists
20th-century women composers